Sofian Chahed (born 18 April 1983) is a football coach and former professional footballer who played as a defender. He is the head coach of 1. FFC Turbine Potsdam in the  Frauen-Bundesliga.

Born in Germany, Chahed represented Tunisia at senior international level.

Early and personal life
Chahed was born in Berlin, West Germany, to Tunisian parents; he holds dual German-Tunisian nationality. His cousin Tarek Chahed was also a footballer.

Playing career

Club career 
Chahed made his professional debut for Hertha BSC in 2003, and was released at the end of the 2009 season. Chahed later played for Hannover 96 and FSV Frankfurt.

International career 
Chahed played for Germany at youth international level.

Chahed was called up by the Tunisian national side for a training camp on 1 September 2009. He made his senior debut for Tunisia on 11 October 2009.

Coaching career 
In 2015, Chahed began working as the assistant manager at BFC Viktoria 1889. From 2016 to 2020, he coached the youth teams of Hertha BSC.

In 2020, Chahed became the head coach of 1. FFC Turbine Potsdam.

References

External links	
 

Living people
1983 births
Association football defenders
Tunisian footballers
Tunisia international footballers
German footballers
Germany youth international footballers
German people of Tunisian descent
Hertha BSC players
Hertha BSC II players
Hannover 96 players
Hannover 96 II players
FSV Frankfurt players
Bundesliga players
Footballers from Berlin